Pablo Martínez (1898 – death date unknown) was a Cuban pitcher in the Negro leagues in the 1920s.

A native of Cienfuegos, Cuba, Martínez played for the Cuban Stars (West) in 1928. In six recorded games on the mound, he posted a 6.39 ERA over 31 innings.

References

External links
 and Seamheads

1898 births
Date of birth missing
Year of death missing
Place of death missing
Cuban Stars (West) players